The Northeastern State RiverHawks football team, representing Northeastern State University , has had ten players selected in the National Football League (NFL) since the league began holding drafts in 1936). This includes one player selected in the third round. The Atlanta Falcons have the most NSU players, as they have drafted three RiverHawks.

Each NFL franchise seeks to add new players through the annual NFL Draft. The draft rules were last updated in 2009. The team with the worst record from the previous year picks first, the next-worst team second, and so on. Teams that did not make the playoffs are ordered by their regular-season record with any remaining ties broken by strength of schedule. Playoff participants are sequenced after non-playoff teams, based on their round of elimination (wild card, division, conference, and Super Bowl).

Key

Selections

References
General

 

Specific

Northeastern State
 
Northeastern State RiverHawks NFL Draft